Ivan Sala (born 20 November 1969) is an Italian former motorcycle racer.

His first race was at Misano racetrack in 1992, where he finished in fourth place. In 2012, he finished 16th in the AMA Superbike Team Edge Performance Suzuki competition at Laguna Seca Raceway.

In December 2004 he moved to Costa Rica and began working in the real estate market and selling bikes.

12 time champion in Costa Rica 300cc , 600cc and 1000cc

2016 Panana champion in superbike 1000cc

2020 champion 600 Cc Costa Rica 
2021 champion 1000 cc costa rica

Récord 1000cc Racetrack parque viva Costa Rica in 56.4 sec

References

Living people
1969 births
Italian motorcycle racers